The following lists events in 2013 in Saudi Arabia.

Incumbents
Monarch: Abdullah
Crown Prince: Salman

Events

January
 9 January - Despite international protest, Sri-Lankan maid Rizana Nafeek is executed in Saudi Arabia for killing an infant in her care.

February

March

April

May

June

July

August

September

October

November

December

References 

 
Saudi Arabia
2010s in Saudi Arabia
Years of the 21st century in Saudi Arabia
Saudi Arabia